Stunt GP is a radio-controlled car racing video game developed by the UK-based studio Team17, released in  2001. It was published by Eon Digital Entertainment for Windows and Dreamcast, and by Titus Software for PlayStation 2. Stunt GP uses the RenderWare engine. It has both single-player and offline multiplayer game modes using the split-screen method, and various game controllers are supported.

Game modes 
The game features five game modes named Arcade, Exhibition, Time Trial, Stunt Challenge and Championship.

Arcade mode allows the player to unlock new content for the game, such as cars and tracks. In Exhibition mode, the player can choose its car, track, the number of AI as well as other settings. Time Trial mode allows the player to beat records on a restricted list of tracks. Stunt Challenge mode lets the player score a maximum number of aerials in a stunt arena. Finally Championship mode consists of a full season of 20 races in which the player will be able to gradually improve the car and its components.

Gameplay

Mechanics 
The radio-controlled car is played in third-person using the arrow keys. The cars are powered with a battery which slowly loses energy over time. Once the battery has run out of energy, the car goes slower and thus the player is severely handicapped. Several game mechanics interacts with the battery level. Near the finish line of each track lies a pit-stop, in which the player can refill the batteries. A speed boost is available by pressing the Control key but it depletes the battery much faster than usual. Stunts are performed while the player is in the air by pressing the Shift key and one of the arrow key. If the stunt is successful, some amount of energy will be restored.

Cars 
There are 20 cars in the game, upon which only 6 are initially available. The others can be unlock by playing modes like Arcade, Time Trial and Championship. They are divided into 4 categories :

Wild Wheels are cars with a solid grip to the road. They are represented by heavy vehicles such as trucks or 4x4. Aero Blasters are vehicles with amazing agility. They spin the fastest while attempting aerials. Their design is futuristic. Speed Demons are cars with the strongest accelerations and top speed. Their lines are sharp and aerodynamic. Team Specials is a special category regrouping eccentric vehicles such as an open-wheel car or a forklift.

In Championship mode, every car can be tweaked extensively, from tyres to engines, suspensions, brakes, batteries, etc.

Development
The game was announced in November 1999. The game was planned to be published by Hasbro Interactive under the Atari Interactive brand name in Europe with a planned release date of March 2000, while Infogrames would publish in North America. However both companies soon dropped out in publishing the game.

Reception

The PlayStation 2 version received "generally unfavorable reviews" according to the review aggregation website Metacritic. In Japan, where the same console version was ported for release on 11 April 2002, Famitsu gave it a score of 29 out of 40.

References

External links
 Stunt GP official website 
 

2001 video games
Atari games
Dreamcast games
PlayStation 2 games
Radio-controlled car racing video games
Team17 games
Titus Software games
Video games developed in the United Kingdom
Video games scored by Bjørn Lynne
Windows games
Multiplayer and single-player video games
Split-screen multiplayer games
RenderWare games
Eon Digital Entertainment games